Yangfangdian Subdistrict is a subdistrict situated on the southern end of Haidian District, Beijing, China. It borders Ganjiakou and Balizhuang Subdistricts to the north, Yuetan Subdistrict to the east, Guang'anmenwai Subdistrict and Fengtai District to the south, and Wanshou Road Subdistrict to the west. Its population was 120,302 as of the year 2020. 

The name Yangfangdian came from the fact that it was a local hub for trading of livestocks during the Jurchen Jin dynasty.

History

Administrative Divisions 
Yangfangdian Subdistrict was composed of 31 residential communities as of 2021:

See also 

 List of township-level divisions of Beijing

References 

Haidian District
Subdistricts of Beijing